Solitary Man may refer to:

 Solitary Man (novel), a novel based on the U.S. television series Angel
 Solitary Man (film), a 2009 film with Michael Douglas
 "Solitary Man" (song), a 1966 song by Neil Diamond
 Solitary Man Records, a German-Japanese independent record label
 American III: Solitary Man, an album by Johnny Cash
 Solitary Men, a 1983 album by Giorgio Moroder and Joe Esposito